Néko Hnepeune (born April 21, 1954, in Wé) is a New Caledonian politician.  A Kanak and advocate for New Caledonian independence, he has served as president of the Loyalty Islands since 2004, and has been mayor of Lifou since 2001.

References

1954 births
Living people
Kanak people
Mayors of places in New Caledonia
People from the Loyalty Islands